Bartolomeo Gennari (10 July 1594 – 29 January 1661) was an Italian Renaissance painter. His painting style is consistent with the Bolognese School of painting.

Biography
Gennari was the son of the painter Benedetto Gennari and Giulia Bovi. Julia Buovi, et fu tenuto da M. Agustino di Faci et la Comar Mad. Jacoma Burgnona li 10 de Julio 1594. Together with his younger brother Ercole Gennari (1597-1658), he was a lifetime associate of the baroque painter Guercino, from whom, he copied several works. He died in Bologna and was buried in the church of San Nicolò of Bologna Albari.

Works
Among his works are Saint Thomas, which was formerly displayed the church of the Most Holy Rosary of Hundred and is now in the Pinacoteca of the town. He has also painted Madonna and Child with St. Felix of Cantalice, which is preserved in the Pinacoteca Comunale di Cesena. The painting St. John the Evangelist Preaches to his Disciples is in the church of San Filippo Neri. One of his students was the Forlì painter Giuseppe Maria Galleppini.

References
 JA Calvi, News of the life and works of the knight Giovanni Francesco Barbieri Guercino, Bologna 1808
 The School of Guercino, edited by E. Negro, M. and N. Pirondini Roio, with a preface by DM Stone, Modena 2004 

Painters from Bologna
Italian Renaissance painters
1594 births
1661 deaths
Italian male painters
People from Cento
17th-century Italian painters